Love, Peace & Poetry – Vol.8 African is the eighth volume in the Love, Peace & Poetry series released by QDK Media and Normal Records in 2004. This volume explores obscuro garage rock and psychedelic rock bands from Africa.

Track listing
 "The Circus" (McCully Workshop Inc.) – 4:02
 "A Madman's Cry" (Otis Waygood) – 4:23
 "Time to Face the Sun" (Blo) – 4:04
 "Moving Away" (Abstract Truth) – 3:55
 "1999" (Freedoms Children) – 4:05
 "Elegy" (Suck) – 3:00
 "Valley of Sadness" (Third Eye) – 3:05
 "Gentle Beasts, Pt. 1" (Freedoms Children) – 1:55
 "The Seventh House" (Mack Sigis) – 2:54
 "The Higher I Go" (Otis Waygood) – 1:42
 "Love Is the Only Way" (Rikki Ililonga) – 4:16
 "Oh Ye Ye" (Chrissy Zebby Tembo, Ngozi Family) – 3:00
 "Weatherman" (Quentin E. Klopjaeger) – 2:47
 "Original Man" (Abstract Truth) – 3:38
 "Kafkasque" (Freedoms Children) – 2:43
 "Young Folk and Old Folk" (Third Eye) – 3:31
 "Gbe Mi Lo" (Ofege) – 4:14

Love, Peace & Poetry albums
2004 compilation albums